Gounelle is a French surname:
 :fr:Laurent Gounelle, author of L'homme qui voulait être heureux
 Pierre-Émile Gounelle (1850–1914) French entomologist
 Eugène Gounelle, French engineer, father of the entomologist
 :fr:André Gounelle, French theologian
 Rémi Gounelle, (born 1967), French Protestant theologian
 Matthieu Gounelle (1971–) curator of meteorites at Museum National d'Histoire Naturelle in Paris
6948 Gounelle asteroid

French-language surnames